The 2018 South and Central American Women's Handball Championship was the first edition of the South and Central American Women's Handball Championship, which took place in Maceió, Brazil from 29 November to 4 December 2018. It acted as the South and Central American qualifying tournament for the 2019 World Women's Handball Championship.

Standings

Results
All times are local (UTC−3).

References

External links
CBHb official website 

South and Central American Women's Handball Championship
South and Central American Women's Handball Championship
South
November 2018 sports events in South America
December 2018 sports events in South America
2018 in Brazilian women's sport
South and Central American Women's Handball Championship